Bob Wilson (8 September 1928 – 17 August 2006) was a footballer who played as a full back in the Football League for Tranmere Rovers.

References

Tranmere Rovers F.C. players
Preston North End F.C. players
New Brighton A.F.C. players
Association football fullbacks
1928 births
English Football League players
Burscough F.C. players
2006 deaths
Footballers from Liverpool
English footballers